The women's hammer throw event at the 1999 European Athletics U23 Championships was held in Göteborg, Sweden, at Ullevi on 30 July and 1 August 1999.

Medalists

Results

Final
1 August

Qualifications
30 July
Qualifying 60.00 or 12 best to the Final

Group A

Group B

Participation
According to an unofficial count, 21 athletes from 14 countries participated in the event.

 (1)
 (1)
 (3)
 (3)
 (1)
 (2)
 (1)
 (1)
 (2)
 (1)
 (1)
 (1)
 (1)
 (2)

References

Hammer throw
Hammer throw at the European Athletics U23 Championships